"3 Kings" is a song by American hip hop recording artist Slim Thug, released as the second single from his debut album Already Platinum (2005). The song was produced by Mr. Lee and Bun B and features fellow Southern rappers T.I. and UGK member Bun B. The song peaked at number 78 on the Billboard Hot R&B/Hip-Hop Songs chart. The song samples Betty Wright's song "Secretary".

Charts

References

2004 songs
2005 singles
Slim Thug songs
Bun B songs
T.I. songs
Songs written by T.I.
Songs written by Bun B
Songs written by Lil Jon
Crunk songs